Reuben Samuel (January 12, 1828 – March 1, 1908) was the stepfather of the American outlaws Frank and Jesse James. He was married to the pair's mother, Zerelda James, from 1855 until his death in 1908.

Early life 
Reuben was the son of Fielding and Louisa Samuel, and was born and raised in Kentucky in 1828. He traveled to Cincinnati to attend medical school. He was described as a "quiet, passive man".

The third husband of Frank and Jesse James' mother, Zerelda, Samuel was 27 years old when he married the 30-year-old Zerelda on September 25, 1855. He left behind the medical profession upon marrying Zerelda and moved onto a farm, raised tobacco, and supposedly acquired a total of seven slaves by 1860. He took on Zerelda's three living children, Frank, Jesse, and Susan, as well as having four more with Zerelda:

 Sarah Louisa Samuel (April 7, 1858 – July 14, 1921)
 John Thomas Samuel (December 25, 1861 – March 15, 1934)
 Fanny Quantrill Samuel (October 18, 1863 – May 3, 1922)
 Archie Peyton Samuel (July 26, 1866 – January 26, 1875)

In addition to the four children with Zerelda, a Perry Samuel was born to a former slave of Samuel's in 1866. While it was never known who the biological father was, some believe it was Dr. Samuel.

Civil War

During the American Civil War, militiamen searching for Frank James (who had joined the South) raided the Samuel farm, and briefly (though not fatally) hanged Dr. Samuel, torturing him to reveal the location of the guerrillas. Some researchers believe that Frank joined William Quantrill's pro-Confederate guerrillas in the August 21, 1863 Lawrence Massacre, but it has never been proven.

Pinkerton Raid
On January 25, 1875, Allan Pinkerton, the Pinkerton Agency's founder and leader, attempted to capture the outlaw James brothers. He staged a raid on Samuel's homestead, throwing an incendiary device into the house; it exploded, killing James's young half-brother Archie (named for Archie Clement) and blowing off the right arm of Zerelda. Samuel himself almost died and suffered brain damage from the explosion. Though Pinkerton denied that the raid's intent was arson, a letter written by Pinkerton was discovered in the Library of Congress in which he declared his intention to "burn the house down."

Death  
Samuel died in 1908 after spending six years at the State Mental Hospital in St. Joseph, Missouri. He was 80 years old.

Some of Reuben Samuel's family still live in the Kansas City, Missouri area.

References

External links
 Official website for the Family of Frank & Jesse James: Stray Leaves, A James Family in America Since 1650: http://www.ericjames.org

1828 births
1908 deaths
James–Younger Gang